Legget is a surname, and may refer to:

Communities
 Leggett, California, a town in California, USA
 Leggett, North Carolina, a town in North Carolina, USA

People
 Archie Legget, English bass player
 Charles Legget (born 1988), Scottish cricketer
 Robert Legget, Canadian non-fiction writer, geologist

Other
 Leggett, a former American department store chain, now part of Belk

See also
 Leggett (disambiguation)
 Legge
 Liggett (disambiguation)